Sadie T. Benning (born April 11, 1973) is an American artist, who has worked primarily in video, painting, drawing, sculpture, photography and sound. Benning creates experimental films and explores a variety of themes including surveillance, gender, ambiguity, transgression, play, intimacy, and identity. They became a known artist as a teenager, with their short films made with a PixelVision camera that have been described as "video diaries".

Benning was a co-founder and a former member of the American electronic rock band Le Tigre, from 1998 until 2001.

Early life
Sadie Benning was born April 11, 1973 in Madison, Wisconsin. Benning was raised by their mother in inner-city Milwaukee, Wisconsin. Their parents divorced before they were born, their father is film director James Benning. Benning left high school at age 16, due to homophobia.

They have identified as non-binary.

Work

Early work 
Benning began creating visual works at age 15, they started filming with the "toy" video camera they received as a Christmas gift from their father, the experimental filmmaker James Benning. Benning used a Fisher-Price PXL-2000 camera, also known as PixelVision, which created pixelated black and white video on standard audio cassette tapes. At first, Benning was standoffish to the PixelVision camera and is quoted as saying, "I thought, 'This is a piece of shit. It's black-and-white. It's for kids. He'd told me I was getting this surprise. I was expecting a camcorder."

They made four short films and brought them to their father's film class he was teaching at Cal Arts, and they screened the films for the first time in front of a class. One of the students put one of the films in a film festival he was organizing. By the age of 19, they had shown their films at the Museum of Modern Art in New York City, the Sundance Institute, and at international film festivals.

Themes
The majority of Benning's shorts combined performance, experimental narrative, handwriting, and cut-up music to explore, among other subjects, gender and sexuality. Benning's work has been included in the Whitney Biennial on four occasions (1993, 2000, 2006), and they were the youngest artist included in the well-known and controversial 1993 Whitney Biennial.

Benning's earlier videos – A New Year, Living Inside, Me and Rubyfruit, Jollies, and If Every Girl Had a Diary - used Benning's isolated surroundings and the effect this had on Benning as a focus for their theme. In Benning's earliest work, A New Year, Benning shied away from being in front of the camera, instead focusing on their surroundings – primarily the confines of their room and bedroom window – to portray their feelings of angst, confusion and alienation. "I don't talk, I'm not physically in it, it's all handwritten text, music; I wanted to substitute objects, things that were around me, to illustrate the events. I used objects in the closest proximity – the television, toys, my dog, whatever."

The themes of sexual identity and the challenges of growing up are repeated throughout the body of Benning's work, who self-identified as a lesbian in 2014. Benning's video Me and Rubyfruit is referred to as their "first video to be presented as a coming-out narrative".  Benning uses pop culture, such as music, television or newspapers, to amplify their message while simultaneously parodying the same pop culture. Benning also draws inspiration from images on television or in movies, observing: "They're totally fake and constructed to entertain and oppress at the same time – they're meaningless to women, and not just to gay women. I got started partly because I needed different images and I never wanted to wait for someone to do it for me". The use of a variety of media in their work gives insight to the viewer on how Benning has been mostly interacting with the world.

As their work has progressed, Benning has increasingly used images of their own body and voice. In works such as If Every Girl Had a Diary, Benning uses the limitations of the PixelVision to get extreme closeups of their own face, eyes, fingers, and other extremities so that the focus is on sections of their face as they narrate their life and thoughts. In 1998, the English Professor Mia Carter observed: "Benning's daring autoerotic and autobiographic videos, [their] ability to make the camera seem a part of [their] self, and extension of [their] body, invite the audience to know [them]."

Later work 
Benning entered Bard College in 2013 and graduated two years later with a MFA degree, where they now work as faculty.

Their work is in various public museum collections including, Museum of Modern Art (MoMA), Whitney Museum of American Art, Smithsonian American Art Museum, Albright-Knox Art Gallery, among others.

Music
In 1998, Benning co-founded Le Tigre, the feminist post-punk band whose members include ex-Bikini Kill singer/guitarist Kathleen Hanna and zinester Johanna Fateman. Benning left the band in 2001 and JD Samson joined Le Tigre after Benning's departure.

Exhibitions

Works

Awards, recognition, and honors
In 1991, the first article about Benning's work, written by Ellen Spiro, appeared in the national gay magazine The Advocate. In 2004, Bill Horrigan curated a retrospective of Benning's works on video. In 2009, Chloe Hope Johnson contributed a chapter in the book There She Goes: Feminist Filmmaking and Beyond (Contemporary Approaches to Film and Media Series) entitled Becoming-Grrrl The Voice and Videos of Sadie Benning.

Benning has received grants and fellowships from Guggenheim Fellowship (2005) by the John Simon Guggenheim Memorial Foundation, Rockefeller Foundation grant (1992), Andrea Frank Foundation, and National Endowment of the Arts (NEA). Awards include the Wexner Center Residency Award in Media Arts (2003–2004, which was extended to 2006), National Alliance for Media Arts and Culture Merit Award, Grande video Kunst Award, and the Los Angeles Film Critics Circle Award.

Their videos are distributed by Video Data Bank.

Publications

References

External links

Sadie Benning in the Video Data Bank.
Senses of Cinema: Great Directors Critical Database
Sadie Benning by Lia Gangitano  Bomb

1973 births
Living people
American experimental filmmakers
American multimedia artists
American video artists
American women sculptors
American women painters
American women photographers
American women experimental filmmakers
American women academics
American LGBT sculptors
American LGBT painters
American LGBT photographers
American feminists
Feminist musicians
LGBT film directors
Women experimental filmmakers
Artists from Milwaukee
Filmmakers from Milwaukee
LGBT people from Wisconsin
Bard College alumni
Le Tigre members
Bard College faculty
Lesbian sculptors
Lesbian painters
Lesbian photographers
Lesbian feminists
Non-binary photographers
Non-binary painters
Non-binary sculptors
Transgender painters
Transgender photographers
Transgender sculptors
American lesbian artists